James William Glassford (March 8, 1914 – September 19, 2016) was an American football player and coach, who served as head coach for the New Hampshire Wildcats and Nebraska Cornhuskers.

Biography
Glassford was born in Lancaster, Ohio, and attended the University of Pittsburgh where he played football, lettering from 1934 through 1936. He earned first-team All-American status at guard in 1936, for the Panthers team that won the 1937 Rose Bowl. He was a member of Phi Delta Theta fraternity and graduated in 1937 with a degree in business administration. Also in 1937, he played for the Cincinnati Bengals of the second American Football League. From 1938 through 1942, Glassford coached football at three different colleges. During World War II, he served in the United States Navy.

From 1946 to 1948, Glassford was head football coach at the University of New Hampshire, where he compiled a 19–5–1 record, including an 8–1 record in 1947 for the Wildcats.  From 1949 to 1955, he was head coach for the University of Nebraska–Lincoln, where he compiled a 31–35–3 record. His three winning seasons there (1950, 1952, and 1954) were the only winning seasons the program had between 1941 and 1961. In 1955, he led the Cornhuskers to their first-ever Orange Bowl, where they lost to Duke, 34–7. Glassford coached three All-Americans in Tom Novak (1949), Bobby Reynolds (1950), and Jerry Minnick (1952).

Glassford retired from coaching after the 1955 season and went into private business in Arizona. He was inducted into the Nebraska Football Hall of Fame in 2002, and turned 100 in 2014. Glassford died in Scottsdale, Arizona, at the age of 102, and was at that time the oldest still-living former pro player, and one of only seven total to have lived a century.

Head coaching record

Source:

 While listed in NCAA records, the Glass Bowl is not considered an NCAA-sanctioned bowl game.

References

1914 births
2016 deaths
American centenarians
Men centenarians
American football fullbacks
American football guards
Carnegie Mellon Tartans football coaches
Manhattan Jaspers football coaches
Nebraska Cornhuskers football coaches
New Hampshire Wildcats football coaches
Pittsburgh Panthers football players
Yale Bulldogs football coaches
People from Lancaster, Ohio
United States Navy personnel of World War II